The BNB VIb (six-B) was a class of two branch line tank locomotives of the Bohemian Northern Railway Company (Böhmische Nordbahn-Gesellschaft) for use  on the Böhmisch Leipa-Steinschönau railway line. They later passed to the Imperial Austrian State Railways, who classified them as kkStB 265. 

The two locomotives were built in Prague in 1907 by the Erste Böhmisch-Mährische Maschinenfabrik (later part of ČKD). 

The locomotives spent their entire lives on their home line. In 1924 the Czechoslovakian State Railways (ČSD) grouped the engines into their ČSD Class 312.7. After the Second World War the Deutsche Reichsbahn gave them the designation DR Class 90.3.

On the introduction into service of new ČSD Class M 131.1 railcars, these locomotives were retired in 1949.

See also 
 :de:Liste der Lokomotiv- und Triebwagenbaureihen der ČSD for a list of Czech locomotives. (German Wikipedia)
 Deutsche Reichsbahn 
 List of DRG locomotives and railbuses

References

External links 
 Description of the ČSD Class 312.7 (Czech)

0-6-2T locomotives
Railway locomotives introduced in 1907
Standard gauge locomotives of Austria
Standard gauge locomotives of Czechoslovakia
Standard gauge locomotives of Germany
Steam locomotives of Austria